Henriette (1387 – 14 February 1444) was Sovereign Countess of Montbéliard from 1397 until 1444.

She was the daughter of Henry of Orbe (died 1396), and the heiress of her grandfather, Stephen, Count of Montbéliard. Her great-grandfather was Henry I of Montbéliard. She married Eberhard IV, Count of Württemberg and governed the city of Montbéliard together with her husband.

It was because of this marriage that Montbéliard became a part of Württemberg. At his death in 1419, she took over the regency for her son Ulrich.

Family and children
She was married to Eberhard IV, Count of Württemberg and had two sons and a daughter:
 Anna of Württemberg (1408–1471), married Philip I, Count of Katzenelnbogen
 Louis I of Württemberg (1412 – 24 September 1450, Urach).
 Ulrich V of Württemberg (1413 – 1 September 1480, Leonberg).

Ancestors

See also
 History of Württemberg
 Franche-Comté

Notes and references

1387 births
1444 deaths
House of Montfaucon
14th-century women rulers
Counts of Montbéliard
House of Württemberg
French suo jure nobility
15th-century women rulers